Dzmitry Dzmitryyevich Mazalewski (born 30 April 1985) is a Belarusian former footballer.

Career
From 2012 to 2016 Mazalewski played for Belarusian Premier League giant club BATE Borisov. BATE had previously expressed in interest in the winter 2009, but the deal fell through. In September 2013 Mazalewski sustained a serious injury which forced him to withdraw from football for almost two years.  He fully recovered by the summer of 2015.

In October 2016 he joined Hong Kong Rangers, but the contract was terminated just a few days later and Mazalewski left the club without playing any matches.

Honours
Dinamo Brest
Belarusian Cup winner: 2006–07, 2016–17, 2017–18

BATE Borisov
Belarusian Premier League champion: 2012, 2013, 2015, 2016
Belarusian Super Cup winner: 2013, 2016

References

External links
 Player profile at BATE site
 
 

1985 births
Living people
Sportspeople from Brest, Belarus
Belarusian footballers
Association football forwards
Belarus international footballers
Belarusian expatriate footballers
Expatriate footballers in Hong Kong
Expatriate footballers in Lithuania
FC Dynamo Brest players
FC BATE Borisov players
Hong Kong Rangers FC players
FK Atlantas players